Filatima neotrophella is a moth of the family Gelechiidae. It is found in North America, where it has been recorded from Texas.

The wingspan is 12–13 mm. The forewings are black, marked with overlaid white scales, forming an oblique, basal greyish-white patch which is widest on the dorsum. There is also an obscure, rather broad median fascia consisting of a narrow, oblique median streak clouded with greyish before and behind. The hindwings are pale smoky fuscous, somewhat shaded with black towards the apex.

The larvae feed on Mimosa berlandieri. They tie the leaves of their host plant and spin a silken tube.

References

Moths described in 1921
Filatima